Pitka or Pitkä may refer to:
Pitka, Iran, a village in Mazandaran Province, Iran
Edward G. Pitka Sr. Airport, state-owned public-use airport in Galena, Alaska
Elämä lyhyt, Rytkönen pitkä, 1991 Finnish novel by Arto Paasilinna
EML Admiral Pitka (A230), Beskytteren-class ocean patrol vessel of the Estonian Navy
Johan Pitka (1872–1944), famous Estonian military commander from the Estonian War of Independence until World War II
Pitkä ihana leikki, the first album by Finnish pop/rock singer-songwriter Maija Vilkkumaa
Rita Pitka Blumenstein, the first certified traditional doctor in Alaska